Phytoecia breverufonotata is a species of beetle in the family Cerambycidae. It was described by Maurice Pic in 1952. It is known from Turkey.

References

Phytoecia
Beetles described in 1952